William Starr Basinger (1827–1910) was a lawyer, military officer, state legislator, and the president of the University of North Georgia. He served as a major in the 18th Georgia Battalion of the Confederate States Army during the Civil War. In 1886 Basinger, succeeding David W. Lewis, became the second president of North Georgia Agricultural College (now UNG).

References

1827 births
1910 deaths
Heads of universities and colleges in the United States
Georgia (U.S. state) lawyers
Confederate States Army officers
People from Savannah, Georgia
19th-century American lawyers